Elena Olegovna Bovina (born 10 March 1983) is a former professional tennis player from Russia. She reached a career-high singles ranking of world No. 14 in April 2005. Her best performance at a Grand Slam tournament came when she got to the quarterfinals of the 2002 US Open, defeating Clarisa Fernández, Jelena Dokic, Stéphanie Foretz and Francesca Schiavone before losing to Lindsay Davenport.

In June 2005, Bovina sustained a right shoulder injury, which forced her to withdraw from all tournaments through the end of the year. She pulled out of all events she had entered in early 2006, and for some time, she was unranked in both singles and doubles. She returned to the WTA Tour at the Kremlin Cup in October 2006.

She has won three career singles titles, including the Tier II Pilot Pen Tennis Open. She has been a finalist in three singles tournaments, and has five career doubles titles, including the Pan Pacific Open, which she won with Rennae Stubbs, and the Swisscom Challenge in Zurich, with Justine Henin-Hardenne. In addition she won the 2004 Australian Open mixed doubles title with Nenad Zimonjić, and was the runner-up in the 2002 French Open mixed doubles tournament. She also was on the victorious 2005 Russian Fed Cup squad and was also on the team from 2001 to 2003.

In 2017, Bovina returned to tennis after a four-year hiatus. She competed in some ITF events during 2017 and the following year.

Grand Slam finals

Mixed doubles: 2 (1 title, 1 runner-up)

WTA career finals

Singles: 6 (3 titles, 3 runner-ups)

Doubles: 8 (5–3)

ITF finals

Singles: 11 (8-3)

Doubles: 17 (11–6)

Grand Slam performance timelines

Singles

Doubles

Mixed doubles

References

External links
 
 
 

1983 births
Living people
Tennis players from Moscow
Russian female tennis players
Grand Slam (tennis) champions in mixed doubles
Australian Open (tennis) champions